Otvodnoye is a rural locality (a village) in Denisovskoye Rural Settlement, Gorokhovetsky District, Vladimir Oblast, Russia. The population was 53 as of 2010. There are 2 streets.

Geography 
Otvodnoye is located on the Kurzha River, 23 km southwest of Gorokhovets (the district's administrative centre) by road. Chulkovo is the nearest rural locality.

References 

Rural localities in Gorokhovetsky District